This list of tallest statues in the Philippines includes free-standing, completed statues in the Philippines that are at least  tall. The height of these statues are measured from the top of its base/pedestal up to its maximum height (including monuments with spires or obelisks).

Existing statues 

Statues being planned/under construction
 Divine Mercy Statue (Consolacion), a  steel and concrete statue of Jesus Christ being planned for construction in Barangay Garing, Consolacion, Cebu. Construction started in January 2020 and is expected to be completed by 2021 in time for the 500th anniversary of the arrival of Christianity in the Philippines.

Destroyed statues
 Bust of Ferdinand Marcos, a  concrete bust of former Philippine President and dictator Ferdinand Marcos in Mount Shontoug, Barangay Taloy Sur, Tuba, Benguet. It was built in 1978 and completed in 1980, but was destroyed by the communist rebel group New People's Army using dynamite in 2002.

See also
List of tallest statues

References

External links

Landmarks in the Philippines
Tourism in the Philippines
Statues
Tallest statues, Philippines